Looney Tunes Meals were a line of frozen dinners released by Tyson Foods in 1990. They were based on the characters from the eponymous Warner Bros. cartoons and targeted primarily at children. The meals were discontinued in late 1993 because of declining sales.

History 
Released to coincide with Bugs Bunny's 50th birthday, the meals came in boxes that featured a Looney Tunes character on the front, and were marketed as coming with small prizes, including comic books, trading cards, and stickers. They came in a tray divided into three sections; a main course, a side dish, and a dessert. The dinners were to be heated in the microwave for 2 minutes, rotated, heated for another 1-2 minutes, then given an additional 2-3 minutes to cool off, making for 5-7 minutes of preparation. These meals were similar to Kid's Kitchen and Kid Cuisine, other popular frozen dinner brands from the time.

The meals were introduced with a fifteen million dollar advertising campaign. With mixed reception from children, there were concerns from parents regarding the nutritional value of the meals. They received criticism for using excessive fat and salt, going against their claims of providing a healthy meal. Likely as a result of this and the '90s economic recession, sales began to decline, and production on the meals ceased in 1993.

Varieties 
The meals were originally released with eight variations, with several other entries being introduced in later years. There would also be a pasta sub-variety in the line, introduced around 1992.
 Bugs Bunny Chicken Chunks – chicken nuggets, macaroni and cheese, and carrots
 Bugs Bunny and Tasmanian Devil Pasta – beef ravioli in tomato sauce
 Daffy Duck Spaghetti and Meatballs – spaghetti and meatballs in tomato sauce, corn, and oatmeal cookies
 Daffy Duck and Elmer Fudd Pasta – pasta in pizza sauce with pepperoni
 Elmer Fudd Turkey and Dressing – turkey breast with dressing and gravy, green beans, and fudge cookies
 Foghorn Leghorn Pepperoni Pizza – pepperoni pizza, corn, and fudge brownie
 Foghorn Leghorn and Henery Hawk Pasta – pasta in spaghetti sauce with meat
 Henery Hawk Hot Dog – hot dog, tater tots, and corn
 Porky Pig Patty Deluxe – sausage patty on a bun with cheese, tater tots, and cherry cobbler
 Road Runner Chicken Sandwich – chicken sandwich, potato wedges, and applesauce
 Road Runner and Wile E. Coyote Pasta – pasta in pizza sauce with Italian sausage
 Speedy Gonzales Beef Enchiladas – beef enchiladas in salsa, Spanish rice, and corn
 Sylvester Fish Sticks – fish sticks, tater tots, and green beans
 Sylvester and Tweety Pasta – pasta in cheesy pizza sauce
 Tasmanian Devil Chicken Drumsticks - chicken drumsticks, mashed potatoes, and corn
 Tweety Macaroni and Cheese – macaroni and cheese, green beans, and applesauce
 Wile E. Coyote Hamburger Pizza – hamburger pizza, green beans, and oatmeal cookies
 Yosemite Sam BBQ Glazed Chicken – chicken wings in barbecue sauce, mashed potatoes, and corn nuggets
In later releases for some of these meals, the side dishes would be changed or altered.

References

External links 
Vintage TV ad for Tyson Looney Tunes Meals
Frozen food brands
Products introduced in 1990
Tyson Foods
Looney Tunes
Products and services discontinued in 1993